Michel Kazanski (born 24 March 1953) is a French archaeologist who is the director of research at the Center for Byzantine History and Civilization of the Collège de France and the French National Centre for Scientific Research.

Biography
Michel Kazanski was born in Riga, then part of the Soviet Union, on March 24, 1953. He was educated at Saint Petersburg State University, the Russian Academy of Sciences and the University of Paris. Since 2008, Kazanski has been the director of research at the Center for Byzantine History and Civilization of the Collège de France and the French National Centre for Scientific Research. Kazanski specializes in the archaeology of the Byzantine Empire and the "barbarian" peoples of the migration period. He is the author of hundreds of scientific articles and dozens of books and monographs on these subjects.

Selected works
 Les Goths, 1991
 L'armée romaine et les barbares, 1993
 La Noblesse romaine et les chefs barbares du IIIe au VIIe siècle, 1995
 Les Slaves, 1999
 Les sites archéologiques en Crimée et au Caucase durant l'antiquité tardive et le haut Moyen-Age, 2000
 Les centres proto-urbains russes entre Scandinavie, Byzance et Orient, 2000
 La nécropole gallo-romaine et mérovingienne de Breny (Aisne), 2002
 Les peuples du Caucase du Nord, 2003
 Des les Goths aux Huns, 2006

References

External links
 Michel Kazanski at Academia.edu
 Curriculum vitae of Michel Kazanski

1953 births
Research directors of the French National Centre for Scientific Research
Academic staff of the Collège de France
French archaeologists
Living people
Archaeologists from Riga
Saint Petersburg State University alumni
University of Paris alumni